Second Crater is a volcanic crater on Arrival Heights, situated 0.6 nautical miles (1.1 km) northeast of First Crater on Hut Point Peninsula, Ross Island. Named by F. Debenham in 1912 on his local survey of Hut Point Peninsula during the British Antarctic Expedition, 1910–13.

Volcanoes of Ross Island
Volcanic craters